The 1886 Lehigh football team represented Lehigh University in the 1886 college football season. The team finished with an overall record of 4–3–1.

Schedule

References

Lehigh
Lehigh Mountain Hawks football seasons
Lehigh football